Saba Gavashelishvili (born December 15, 1987) is a Georgian judoka, who played for the half-middleweight category. He is a two-time Georgian judo champion, and a silver medalist for his division at the 2008 IJF World Cup Series in Prague, Czech Republic.

Gavashelishvili represented Georgia at the 2008 Summer Olympics in Beijing, where he competed for the men's half-middleweight class (81 kg). He lost the first preliminary round match, by an ippon and a sankaku-jime (triangle choke), to Portugal's João Neto.

References

External links
 
 NBC Olympics Profile

Male judoka from Georgia (country)
Living people
Olympic judoka of Georgia (country)
Judoka at the 2008 Summer Olympics
1987 births
21st-century people from Georgia (country)